Jacob's Dream is a 1639 oil-on-canvas painting by the Spanish Tenebrist painter José de Ribera (Lo Spagnoletto).

Description
It measures  and is in the Museo del Prado in Madrid.

Analysis
Jacob appears as a shepherd sleeping, resting on his left shoulder with a tree behind him. In the background on the other side is the ladder that he sees in his dream. It is not a wooden ladder but a ladder of light, by which angels are ascending and descending.

References
El sueño de Jacob, El Prado
Jusepe de Ribera, 1591-1652 , Issued in connection with an exhibition held  Sept. 18-Nov. 29, 1992, Metropolitan Museum of Art, New York (see pages: 135–137).

Paintings by Jusepe de Ribera
Angels in art
Paintings depicting Jacob
1639 paintings
Jacob